Events from the year 1995 in art.

Events
 January – New San Francisco Museum of Modern Art, designed by Mario Botta, opens.
 June – Narendra Patel's sculpture Jantar-Mantar, on the campus of the University of Wisconsin–Milwaukee (UWM) on the east side of Milwaukee, Wisconsin., is dedicated.
 November 28 – Barcelona Museum of Contemporary Art, designed by Richard Meier, opens.

Exhibitions
October 22 – Brilliant!, an exhibition by the Young British Artists group (who also feature heavily in this year’s British Art Show), opens at the Walker Art Center, Minneapolis, USA.

Works

Larry D. Alexander – Clinton Family Portrait
Ilan Averbuch – Little Prince (sculpture, Portland, Oregon)
Christo and Jeanne Claude - "Wrapped Reichstag" in Berlin, Germany
Tracey Emin – Everyone I Have Ever Slept With 1963–1995 ("The Tent")
Helen Frankenthaler - Cassis
Lucian Freud – Benefits Supervisor Sleeping
Antony Gormley – Havmannen (sculpture)
Marcus Harvey – Myra
Philip Jackson (sculptor)
Dolphin Group
Jersey Liberation Memorial
Maggie Reading
Rachel Joynt and Remco deFouw – Perpetual Motion (sculpture, Naas by-pass, Ireland)
Nabil Kanso – series
Dance of Salome
The Raven
Yue Minjun - Execution
Sir Eduardo Paolozzi – Newton (sculpture)
Cornelia Parker – Embryo Firearms (preempted objects)
Cornelia Parker and Tilda Swinton – The Maybe (performance piece)
Nari Ward - Peace Keeper

Awards
Archibald Prize – William Robinson, Self-portrait with stunned mullet
John Moores Painting Prize - David Leapman for "Double-Tongued Knowability
Schock Prize in Visual Arts – Claes Oldenburg
Turner Prize – Damien Hirst (Mona Hatoum, Callum Innes, and Mark Wallinger were shortlisted).

The Venice Biennial
The Golden Lion for best Pavilion : Akram El-Magdoub, Hamdi Attia, Medhat Shafik, and Khaled Shokry representing Egypt

Births

Deaths

January to June
February – Robert Stewart, Scottish textile designer (b. 1924)
March 18 – Robin Jacques, English illustrator (b. 1920)
April 1 – Dame Lucie Rie, Austrian-born British studio potter (b. 1902)
April 3 – Lang Jingshan, Chinese  photographer (b. 1892)
April 15 – Harry Shoulberg, American expressionist painter (b. 1903)
April 24 – Lodewijk Bruckman, Dutch magic realist painter (b. 1903)
May 26 – Friz Freleng, American animator, cartoonist, director and producer (b. 1906)
May 30 – William McVey, American sculptor (b. 1905)
June 22 - Al Hansen, American artist (b. 1927)

July to December
July 4 – Bob Ross, American painter and television presenter (b.1942)
July 24 – George Rodger, English photographer (b.1908)
August 23 – Alfred Eisenstaedt, German American photographer (b.1898)
August 28 – Carl Giles, English cartoonist (b.1916)
September 3 – Mary Adshead, English painter (b.1904)
October 21
Jesús Blasco, Spanish comic book author and artist (b.1919)
Nancy Graves, American sculptor, painter and printmaker (b.1939)
October 26 – Wilhelm Freddie, Danish painter and sculptor (b.1909).
date unknown
Jean-Yves Couliou, French painter (b.1916)
Stevan Knežević, Serbian painter, sculptor and professor of art (b.1940)

References

 
Years of the 20th century in art
1990s in art